is a Japanese manga artist. In June 2000, his debut work, began serialization in the Comic Flapper manga magazine.

"The Fireworks of 2015" would serve as a prequel to his later and most notable work, Twin Spica, which began serialization in September 2001 in Comic Flapper. Twin Spica was adapted in 2003 into an anime television series, animated by Group TAC and directed by Tomomi Mochizuki, which premièred in Japan on NHK.

Works
Twin Spica (2001–2009)
Hoshi no Koe (2002), novel illustrations
Gunryoku no Jiu (2010–2013)

References

External links

1973 births
Manga artists from Tokyo
Living people
People from Tokyo